Virginia's 26th House of Delegates district elects one of 100 seats in the Virginia House of Delegates, the lower house of the state's bicameral legislature. District 26 includes part of Rockingham County as well as the city of Harrisonburg. As of 2019, it is represented by Republican Tony Wilt.

District officeholders

Electoral history

References

External links
 

Virginia House of Delegates districts

Rockingham County, Virginia
Harrisonburg, Virginia